The Surface is a 2014 American drama thriller film directed by Gil Cates Jr. and starring Sean Astin, Mimi Rogers, Chris Mulkey, and Jeff Gendelman. Gendelman also served as the films writer and producer.

Plot 
Mitch takes his late father’s boat out to the center of Lake Michigan for a final ride in his memory, but collides with the wreckage of a small plane in the water. Kelly, the pilot who survived the crash but severely injured, is pulled onto Mitch’s boat for rescue. However, the debris of the wreckage had knocked the propeller off the boat’s motor, leaving both men stranded in the middle of the vast lake.

Cast 
 Sean Astin as Mitch 
 Mimi Rogers as Kim
 Chris Mulkey as Kelly
 Jeff Gendelman as John
 Rachel Renee as Laurie
 Neil Willenson as Nelson, Fox TV cameraman.
 Sam Fuhrer as The Waterskier
 John Emmet Tracy as Bank Manager
 Elvis Thao as Factory Worker
 Deleono Johnson as Factory Worker
 David John Rosenthal as Fisherman
 Dylan Simon as Cheering Fan
 Veronica Handeland as Bowling Alley Patron (uncredited)

Production 
On July 22, 2013 Sean Astin and Mimi Rogers joined the cast of the film, Gil Cates Jr. is directing the film and Jeff Gendelman wrote the script for thriller film. Mimi Rogers also joined the cast on 7 August in the Good Notes Productions financing film.

Filming 
The shooting of the film began on August 10, 2013 in Milwaukee, Wisconsin.

References

External links 
 

2014 films
2014 drama films
2014 thriller drama films
American thriller drama films
Films directed by Gil Cates Jr.
Films scored by Jeff Russo
Films shot in Wisconsin
2010s English-language films
2010s American films